Naumi may refer to:
Naumi Hospitality, a hotel chain headquartered in Singapore
Zarin Tasnim Naumi, a Bangladeshi singer
Ram naumi, a spring festival of Hinduism for celebrating the birthday of Lord Rama